Stilida is a genus of true bugs in the family Tessaratomidae, and endemic to Australia.

References 

Tessaratomidae
Pentatomomorpha genera
Hemiptera of Australia